Taurorcus is a genus of beetles in the family Cerambycidae, containing the following species:

 Taurorcus chabrillacii Thomson, 1857
 Taurorcus mourei Marinoni, 1969

References

Acanthoderini